Zlatenek (in older sources also Slatenek) is a dispersed settlement above Blagovica in the Municipality of Lukovica in the eastern part of the Upper Carniola region of Slovenia.

Name
Zlatenek was attested in written sources as Oberslatenikch in 1378, Slatenik in 1379, Slätenig in 1414, and Slattonig in 1451.

References

External links
 
Zlatenek on Geopedia

Populated places in the Municipality of Lukovica